Randall K. Burrows (1829−?), nicknamed R. K., was an American politician and businessman.

Born in Connecticut, Burrows lived in Pine City, Minnesota and was a manufacturer. He served in the Minnesota State Senate in 1874.

References

1829 births
Year of death unknown
People from Connecticut
People from Pine City, Minnesota
Businesspeople from Minnesota
Minnesota state senators